NYC is an album by Kieran Hebden and Steve Reid. Hebden and Reid had previously collaborated on three studio albums, with NYC becoming their final release before Reid's death in 2010. Inspiration for the album came from Reid's home city, with the two musicians meeting to record the music over two days in February 2008 at New York's Avatar Studios. The album was released by Domino Records in November 2008.

Track listing
All tracks composed by Kieren Hebden and Steve Reid
"Lyman Place" – 7:05 
"1st & 1st" – 6:16 
"25th Street" – 6:28 
"Arrival" – 9:23 
"Between B & C" – 5:46 
"Departure" – 7:14

Personnel
Kieran Hebden – samples, electronics and guitar
Steve Reid – drums and percussion

References

External links

2008 albums
Domino Recording Company albums
Albums produced by Kieran Hebden
Collaborative albums